Things Wives Tell is a 1926 American silent drama film directed by Hugh Dierker and starring Gaston Glass, Edna Murphy and George Hackathorne.

Cast
 Gaston Glass as Carl Burgess 
 Edna Murphy as Elaine Mackay 
 Harlan Knight as Colonel Burgess 
 George Hackathorne as Charles 
 Walter Long as Ben Felton 
 Lila Leslie
 Margaret Seddon

References

Bibliography
 Munden, Kenneth White. The American Film Institute Catalog of Motion Pictures Produced in the United States, Part 1. University of California Press, 1997.

External links

1926 films
1926 drama films
Silent American drama films
American silent feature films
1920s English-language films
American black-and-white films
Films directed by Hugh Dierker
1920s American films